was a  of the Imperial Japanese Navy.

Design and description
The Yūgumo class was a repeat of the preceding  with minor improvements that increased their anti-aircraft capabilities. Their crew numbered 228 officers and enlisted men. The ships had two Kampon geared steam turbines, each driving one propeller shaft, using steam provided by three Kampon water-tube boilers.

The main armament of the Yūgumo class consisted of six Type 3  guns in three twin-gun turrets, one superfiring pair aft and one turret forward of the superstructure. The guns were able to elevate up to 75° to increase their ability against aircraft, but their slow rate of fire, slow traversing speed, and the lack of any sort of high-angle fire-control system meant that they were virtually useless as anti-aircraft guns. They were built with four Type 96  anti-aircraft guns in two twin-gun mounts, but more of these guns were added over the course of the war. The ships were also armed with eight  torpedo tubes in a two quadruple traversing mounts; one reload was carried for each tube. Their anti-submarine weapons comprised two depth charge throwers for which 36 depth charges were carried.

Construction and career
On  12 July 1943, Kiyonami was on a troop transport run to Kolombangara.

On 20 July Kiyonami was on another troop transport run to Kolombangara. About sixty men survived the sinking, but only one was rescued after several days, leaving only one survivor from Kiyonami's crew of 241 men, and no survivors from Yūgure's crew of 228.

Notes

References

External links
 CombinedFleet.com: Yūgumo-class destroyers
 CombinedFleet.com: Kiyonami history

Yūgumo-class destroyers
World War II destroyers of Japan
Destroyers sunk by aircraft
Shipwrecks in the Solomon Sea
1942 ships
Maritime incidents in July 1943
Ships sunk by US aircraft
Ships built by Uraga Dock Company